Reza may refer to:
 Reza, Khuzestan
 Reza, South Khorasan

See also
 Deh Reza (disambiguation)